Pseudorypteryx is a genus of cave barklice in the family Psyllipsocidae. There is one described species in Pseudorypteryx, P. mexicana.

References

Trogiomorpha
Articles created by Qbugbot